The  (GSJ) is a research institute and department of the National Institute of Advanced Industrial Science and Technology (AIST), an Independent Administrative Institution under the Ministry of Economy, Trade and Industry (METI). The Survey was initially formed in 1882 under the Ministry of Agriculture and Commerce. The Geological Survey of Japan conducts surveys of and publishes research into the geology of Japan, produces geological maps of Japan, and operates the Geological Museum.

Publications
  (1950–; vols. 1–)
  (1953–2011; nos. 1–679)
  (2012–; vols. 1–)

See also
 List of Independent Administrative Institutions (Japan)
 Heinrich Edmund Naumann

References

External links
 Geological Survey of Japan

Geological surveys
Geology of Japan
Research institutes in Japan
1882 establishments in Japan